Eucalyptus longissima is a species of mallee or small tree that is endemic to the south-west of Western Australia. It has rough, fibrous or stringy bark on the trunk, smooth greyish brown bark above, glossy green, lance-shaped adult leaves, flower buds in group of between seven and thirteen, white flowers and shortened spherical fruit.

Description
It has smooth greyish brown bark, usually with rough, fibrous or stringy bark on most of the trunk. Flowering has been observed in most months and the flowers are white.

Taxonomy and naming
Eucalyptus longissima was first formally described in 2005 by Dean Nicolle in Australian Systematic Botany. The specific epithet (longissima) is the superlative form of the Latin word longus, hence "longest", referring to the juvenile leaves, peduncles and pedicels.

Distribution and habitat
This eucalypt grows in sand or loam over limestone in the Coolgardie, Great Victoria Desert, Murchison and Yalgoo biogeographic regions of Western Australia.

Conservation status
This eucalypt is classified as "not threatened" in Western Australia by the Western Australian Government Department of Parks and Wildlife.

See also
List of Eucalyptus species

References

Eucalypts of Western Australia
longissima
Myrtales of Australia
Flora of Victoria (Australia)
Plants described in 2005